The Jiu Guo Zhi ("Records of the Nine Kingdoms") is a Chinese history book written by Lu Zhen (957–1014), covering the "unorthodox" states or 9 of the "Ten Kingdoms" in the 10th-century Five Dynasties and Ten Kingdoms period: Wu, Southern Tang, Wuyue, Former Shu, Later Shu, Northern Han (which it calls "Eastern Han"), Southern Han, Min Kingdom, and Chu. Lu Zhen died before completing the book, and Zhang Tangying (張唐英) added some materials. Later Lu Zhen's son Lu Lun (路綸) added 2 chapters on Jingnan (which he called "Northern Chu").

The book originally contained 51 chapters, but chapters on the royal annuals have disappeared. In the 18th century, historian Shao Jinhan (邵晉涵) extracted surviving chapters from the Yongle Encyclopedia, which were recompiled by Zhou Mengtang (周夢棠) into a 12-chapter book.

References

Chinese history texts
11th-century history books
Song dynasty literature
History books about the Five Dynasties and Ten Kingdoms
11th-century Chinese books